The Soncino family (משפחת שונצינו) is an Italian Ashkenazi Jewish family of printers, deriving its name from the town of Soncino in the duchy of Milan. It traces its descent through a Moses of Fürth, who is mentioned in 1455, back to a certain Moses of Speyer, of the middle of the fourteenth century. The first of the family engaged in printing was Israel Nathan b. Samuel, the father of Joshua Moses and the grandfather of Gershon. He set up his Hebrew printing-press in Soncino in the year 1483, and published his first work, the tractate Berakot, Dec. 19, 1483. The press was moved about considerably during its existence. It can be traced at Soncino in 1483-86; Casal mayore, 1486; Soncino again, 1488–90; Naples, 1490–92; Brescia, 1491–1494; Barco, 1494–97; Fano, 1503-6; Pesaro, 1507–20 (with intervals at Fano, 1516, and Ortona, 1519); Rimini, 1521-26. Members of the family were at Constantinople between 1530 and 1533, and had a branch establishment at Salonica in 1532-33. Their printers' mark was a tower.

The last of the Soncinos was Gershom b. Eliezer, a grandson of Gershom b. Moses, who established the first printing press of the Middle East in Cairo circa 1557. It is obvious that the mere transfer of their workshop must have had a good deal to do with the development of the printing art among the Jews, both in Italy and in Turkey. While they devoted their main attention to Hebrew books, they published also a considerable number of works in general literature, and even religious works with Christian symbols.

The Soncino prints, though not the earliest, excelled all the others in their perfection of type and their correctness. The Soncino house is distinguished also by the fact that the first Hebrew Bible was printed there. An allusion to the forthcoming publication of this edition was made by the type-setter of the "Sefer ha-Ikkarim" (1485), who, on page 45, parodied Isa. ii. 3 thus: "Out of Zion shall go forth the Law, and the word of the Lord from Soncino". Abraham b. Hayyim's name appears in the Bible edition as type-setter, and the correctors included Solomon b. Perez Bonfoi ("Mibhar ha-Peninim"), Gabriel Strassburg (Berakot), David b. Elijah Levi and Mordecai b. Reuben Baselea (Hullin), and Eliezer b. Samuel ("Yad").

Family members

Israel Nathan b. Samuel b. Moses Soncino

Died at Brescia, probably in 1492. He wrote the Epilogue for the Mahzor of 1486. It was at his suggestion that his son Joshua Soncino took up the work of printing.

Joshua Solomon b. Israel Nathan Soncino

Printer at Soncino from 1483 to 1488, at Naples from 1490 to 1492. He was the uncle of Gershon Soncino. It would appear that he had most to do with starting the printing of the Talmud.

Gershon b. Moses Soncino
(in Italian works, Jeronimo Girolima Soncino; in Latin works, Hieronymus Soncino):

The most important member of the family; born probably at Soncino; died at Constantinople 1534. He claims to have been of great assistance to the exiles from Spain, and especially to those from Portugal; and he made journeys to France in order to collect manuscripts for the works to be printed. He makes a pun upon his name by printing it as two words, "Ger Sham," referring to his many travels. In dedicating his edition of Petrarch (Fano, 1503) to Cæsar Borgia, he mentions that he had had Latin, Greek, and Hebrew types cut out by Francesco da Bologna, who is credited also with having made the cursive types attributed to Aldus Manutius. It is curious that Aldus, for his introduction to a Hebrew grammar (Venice, 1501), used the same types that had been employed by Soncino in 1492.

Eliezar b. Gershon Soncino

Printer between 1534 and 1547. He completed "Miklol" (finished in 1534), the publication of which had been begun by his father, and published "Meleket ha-Mispar," in 1547; and Isaac b. Sheshet's responsa, likewise in 1547.

Gershom b. Eliezer Soncino

Moved to Cairo circa 1550, where he established the first printing press of the Middle East. His activities are known solely from two fragments discovered in the Cairo Genizah, dating to 1557 and 1562.

Moses Soncino

Printer at Salonica in 1526 and 1527; assisted in the printing of the Catalonian Mahzor and of the first part of the Yalkut.

List of books printed by the Soncinos

See also 
 Hebrew incunabula
 Early editions of the Hebrew Bible
 Daniel Bomberg's Publication of the Babylonian Talmud (1519-23) adopted the format created by Joshua Solomon Soncino, with the Talmud text in the middle of the page and the commentaries of Rashi and Tosfot surrounding it. Published with the approval of Pope Leo X, this edition became the standard format, which all later editions have followed.

References

External links 
 Judaic Treasures of the Library of Congress: Gershom Soncino’s First Book

Italian printers
Printers of incunabula
Jewish printing and publishing